Jaclyn Katrina Demis Sawicki (born November 14, 1992) is a footballer who plays as a midfielder for Western United in the A-League Women, which she captains. Born in Canada, she represents the Philippines women's national team.

Early life
Born and raised in Coquitlam, Canada – Sawicki started playing the sport when she was 7 years old.

Career

Youth
Sawicki had her youth career in Coquitlam Metro-Ford and Vancouver Whitecaps.

College
Sawicki has played collegiate soccer at University of Victoria.

Elfen Saitama
In 2017, Sawicki signed her first professional contract for Nadeshiko Division 1 League club Chifure AS Elfen Saitama.

Assi IF
After a season in Japan, Sawicki joined Swedish Elitettan club Assi IF.

Western United
On August 18, 2022, Sawicki signed for A-League Women side Western United. She became the second international player to join the club. Later, it was announced that Sawicki was appointed as club captain for the inaugural season.

International career
Sawicki was born in Canada to a Polish father and a Filipina mother, which made her eligible to represent Canada, Poland and Philippines at international level.

Canada U20
Sawicki was called up to represent Canada U20 in the 2012 CONCACAF Women's U-20 Championship after making her first international appearance with the senior team in 2011 against USA during their post World Cup Celebration Tour. The team finished second in the tournament. Five months later, Sawicki was once again called up to the Canada U20 team for the 2012 FIFA U-20 Women's World Cup.

Canada
Sawicki made her senior debut for Canada on September 17, 2011, as a 90th-minute substitution in a 1–1 friendly away draw against the United States.

Philippines
Sawicki was included in the Philippines squad for a month-long training camp in Australia. The training camp was part of the national team's preparation for the 2021 Southeast Asian Games held in Hanoi, Vietnam.

She made her debut for the Philippines as a starter in a 5–0 win against Tonga.

Honours

Individual
 U20 Female Canadian Player of the Year nominee: 2012

International

Canada U20
CONCACAF Women's U-20 Championship runner-up: 2012

Philippines
Southeast Asian Games third place: 2021
AFF Women's Championship: 2022

See also
List of association footballers who have been capped for two senior national teams
List of Canada women's international soccer players
List of Vancouver Whitecaps Women players

References

External links

1992 births
Living people
People from Coquitlam
Soccer people from British Columbia
Citizens of the Philippines through descent
Canadian women's soccer players
Filipino women's footballers
Women's association football midfielders
Vancouver Whitecaps FC (women) players
Victoria Vikes athletes
Victoria Highlanders players
Chifure AS Elfen Saitama players
Assi IF players
Western United FC (A-League Women) players
USL W-League (1995–2015) players
Nadeshiko League players
Elitettan players
A-League Women players
Canada women's international soccer players
Philippines women's international footballers
Dual internationalists (women's football)
Canadian expatriate women's soccer players
Filipino expatriate footballers
Canadian expatriate sportspeople in Japan
Filipino expatriate sportspeople in Japan
Expatriate women's footballers in Japan
Canadian expatriate sportspeople in Sweden
Filipino expatriate sportspeople in Sweden
Expatriate women's footballers in Sweden
Canadian people of Polish descent
Canadian sportspeople of Filipino descent
Filipino people of Polish descent
Southeast Asian Games bronze medalists for the Philippines
Southeast Asian Games medalists in football
Competitors at the 2021 Southeast Asian Games